Drydene 311 refers to two NASCAR Cup Series races at Dover International Speedway:

 Drydene 311 (Saturday), traditionally held in the spring
 Drydene 311 (Sunday), traditionally held in the fall